The Belarusian Democratic Republic 100th Jubilee Medal is a medal awarded in 2018 by the Rada of the Belarusian Democratic Republic (the government in exile of the Belarusian Democratic Republic) to commemorate the 100th anniversary of the establishment of the republic in 1918. The medal has been awarded to more than 180 activists, politicians and researchers in Belarus and abroad.

Design

The obverse features the Pahonia, the symbol of the Belarusian Democratic Republic, and the inscription . The reverse features the inscription  with oak branches and the Cross of Saint Euphrosyne. The ribbon is white with a red stripe separated by thin black lines.

Recipients 
Recipients of the medal include:
 Uładzimir Arłou, writer and historian
 Svetlana Alexievich, writer and Nobel Prize laureate
 Bohdan Andrusyshyn, journalist and singer
 Nina Baginskaya, political and human rights activist
 Jim Dingley, translator of Belarusian Literature into English
 Siarhiej Dubaviec, journalist and writer
 Stefan Eriksson, former Swedish ambassador to Belarus
 Michael Kozak, former US Ambassador to Belarus
 George A. Krol, former US Ambassador to Belarus
 Adam Maldzis, historian, literary critic, author and journalist
 Helen Michaluk, activist of the Belarusian community in the United Kingdom
 Zianon Pazniak, politician, one of the founders of the Belarusian Popular Front and nominee for President of Belarus in the 1994 election
 Natalya Radina, journalist
 Piatro Sadoŭski, first ambassador of the Republic of Belarus to Germany
 Stanislau Shushkevich, first post-Soviet head of state of independent Belarus
 Daniel V. Speckhard, former US Ambassador to Belarus
 Jury Turonak, historian and activist of the Belarusian minority in Poland
 Dr. Jan Zaprudnik, historian and activist of the Belarusian community in the United States

References

Orders, decorations, and medals of Belarus
Belarusian National Republic
Awards established in 2018
2018 establishments in Belarus
Anniversaries